The following is a list of managers who formed part of the All-American Girls Professional Baseball League (AAGPBL) during its twelve years of existence, from its inception in  through the  season.

This list presents data from an eight-year collaborative research project commanded by the AAGPBL Players' Association and is considered to be the definitive list of all the known managers that ever formed part of the league.

Bill Allington became the most successful manager in league history. He never had a losing season, while setting all-time records for the most championships titles (four, 1945 and 1948–1950), postseason appearances (nine, 1945–1946, 1948–1954), as well as regular season victories (583) and winning percentage (.594).

Some information is not available and is subject to future additions and eventual improvement.

References
 All-American Girls Professional Baseball League Official Website
 All-American Girls Professional Baseball League Record Book – W. C. Madden. Publisher: McFarland & Company, 2000. Format: Paperback, 294pp. Language: English. 

 
Lists of baseball managers